Archips seditiosa is a moth of the family Tortricidae. It is found in western Malaysia and Java.

The larvae have been recorded feeding on Albizia, Derris, Tephrosia purpureae, Hibiscus sabdariffa, Citrus, Solanum tomentosum, Cinnamomum zeylanicum and Glycine max.

References

Moths described in 1990
Archips
Moths of Asia